Robert McMahon (born 28 July 1977) is a former Australian rules footballer who played for Fitzroy in the Australian Football League (AFL) in 1996. He was recruited from the Gippsland Power in the TAC Cup with the 6th selection in the 1994 AFL Draft. Despite playing well for the Hawthorn reserves side, he was never selected to play another AFL game.

References

External links

Living people
1977 births
Fitzroy Football Club players
Williamstown Football Club players
Australian rules footballers from Victoria (Australia)